A cleaning station is a location where aquatic life congregate to be cleaned by smaller creatures. Such stations exist in both freshwater and marine environments, and are used by animals including fish, sea turtles and hippos, referred to as clients.

The cleaning process includes the removal of parasites from the animal's body (both externally and internally), and is performed by various smaller animals including  cleaner shrimp and numerous species of cleaner fish, especially wrasses and gobies (Elacatinus spp.), collectively referred to as cleaners.

When the animal approaches a cleaning station, it will open its mouth wide or position its body in such a way as to signal that it needs to be cleaned. The cleaner fish will then remove and eat the parasites from the skin, even swimming into the mouth and gills of any fish being cleaned. This is a form of cleaning symbiosis. How predator clients recognize cleaners is still uncertain. It has been hypothesized that color, size, and pattern indicate to clients that an organism is a cleaner. For example, cleaning gobies tend to exhibit full-body lateral stripes, unlike their non-cleaning counterparts, which exhibit shorter lateral stripes. Cleaners also tend to be smaller because in fish species, usually juveniles are cleaners. 

Cleaning stations may be associated with coral reefs, located either on top of a coral head or in a slot between two outcroppings. Other cleaning stations may be located under large clumps of floating seaweed or at an accepted point in a river or lagoon. Cleaning stations are an exhibition of mutualism between cleaners and clients. 

Cleaner fish may also impact species diversity around coral reefs. Some clients have smaller home ranges and can only access one cleaning station. Clients with larger home ranges are able to access a variety of cleaning stations and are capable of choosing between cleaning stations. Visitor clients travel long distances to a cleaning station and are not local to the ecosystem. This suggests that cleaners attract visitors to the local cleaning station ecosystem and thereby, affect species distribution in the local community.  

Some species of combtooth blenny, most notably the false cleanerfish, mimic the appearance and behaviour of cleaners, then tear away scales or flesh when suitably close to the victim. This behavior is referred to as cheating. If a client fish has been cheated previously at a station, it is unlikely to return to the station. Otherwise, when a client fish has undergone cleaning at a cleaning station without incident, it will likely return to the station for subsequent cleanings.

Gallery

See also
Doctor fish
Lysmata amboinensis

References 

 
 
 
 

Marine biology